La Vendetta... is the seventh studio album by American hardcore punk band the Adolescents. The record was released on July 11, 2014 via Concrete Jungle Records label.

Track listing

Personnel
Leroy Merlin - rhythm guitar
Paul Miner - producer, engineer, mastering, mixing, backing vocals
Tony Reflex - lead vocals
Mario Riviere - artwork
Dan Root - backing vocals, lead guitar
Efrem Martinez Schulz - backing vocals
Steve Soto - bass, producer, backing vocals
Greg Stocks - backing vocals
Martin Wegner - mastering (vinyl)

References

2014 albums
Adolescents (band) albums